The 2021–22 Adelaide Strikers Women's season was the seventh in the team's history. Coached by Luke Williams and captained by Tahlia McGrath, the Strikers ended the regular season of WBBL07 in fourth place, qualifying for the knockout stage of the tournament. They proceeded to defeat the Brisbane Heat and the Melbourne Renegades in sudden death encounters to book a place in the Final against the Perth Scorchers at Perth Stadium on 27 November 2021. In the championship decider, the Strikers were defeated by 12 runs, resulting in their second runners-up finish in three seasons.

Squad 
Each 2021–22 squad was made up of 15 active players. Teams could sign up to five 'marquee players', with a maximum of three of those from overseas. Marquees were defined as any overseas player, or a local player who holds a Cricket Australia national contract at the start of the WBBL|07 signing period.

Personnel changes made ahead of the season included:

 New Zealand marquee Suzie Bates and Jamaican marquee Stafanie Taylor did not re-sign for the Strikers, opting to sit out of the tournament. Tahlia McGrath was appointed captain, replacing the outgoing Bates (24–21 win–loss record).
 South African marquee Dane van Niekerk signed with the Strikers, departing the Sydney Sixers and having previously played for the Melbourne Renegades.
 Jemma Barsby signed with the Strikers, departing the Perth Scorchers and having previously played for the Brisbane Heat.
 Ellie Falconer departed the Strikers, signing with the Melbourne Renegades.
 Nell Bryson-Smith signed with the Strikers, having joined the Hobart Hurricanes in WBBL|06 as a replacement player.

Squad details during the season included:
 Megan Schutt did not partake in the Tasmanian leg of the tournament, missing the Strikers' first four games while on parental leave.

The table below lists the Strikers players and their key stats (including runs scored, batting strike rate, wickets taken, economy rate, catches and stumpings) for the season.

Ladder

Fixtures 
All times are local

Regular season

Eliminator

Challenger

Final

Statistics and awards 

 Most runs: Katie Mack – 513 (2nd in the league)
Highest score in an innings: Katie Mack – 89* (67) vs Melbourne Stars, 21 November 2021
Most wickets: Amanda-Jade Wellington – 23 (1st in the league)
Best bowling figures in an innings: Amanda-Jade Wellington – 5/8 (4 overs) vs Brisbane Heat, 24 November 2021
Most catches (fielder): Bridget Patterson – 11 (1st in the league)
Player of the Match awards:
Darcie Brown – 3
Katie Mack, Tahlia McGrath, Laura Wolvaardt – 2 each
Amanda-Jade Wellington – 1
WBBL|07 Team of the Tournament: Tahlia McGrath, Amanda-Jade Wellington, Darcie Brown
Strikers Most Valuable Player: Katie Mack

References 

2021–22 Women's Big Bash League season by team
Adelaide Strikers (WBBL)